Loren Gerard Woods (born 21 June 1978) is an American former professional basketball player. He previously played six seasons in the National Basketball Association (NBA).

High school and college career
Born in St. Louis, Missouri, Woods attended high school at Cardinal Ritter College Prep. He started his college career at Wake Forest University, where he was supposed to take over the center position once Tim Duncan left. However, he transferred to the University of Arizona.

Professional career
Woods was selected by the Minnesota Timberwolves in the second round of the 2001 NBA Draft. After leaving the Timberwolves, Woods played for the Miami Heat and the Toronto Raptors, where he appeared in 45 games during the 2004–05 season and posted a career best 3.9 points per game. On 15 August 2006, he signed with the Sacramento Kings as a backup center, but he was waived before the season began.

Woods joined the Lithuanian giants Žalgiris Kaunas in 2007. In June 2007, he joined the Turkish side Efes Pilsen. He signed two 10-day contracts with the Houston Rockets on 21 March and 1 April 2008. He was then waived by the Rockets on 14 July 2008. he signed again with Žalgiris Kaunas on 16 July. His tenure with the Rockets ended up being his last time in the NBA, as his final game was Game 1 of the 2008 Western Conference First Round against the Utah Jazz on a April 19, 2008. In his final game, Woods played for only one minute but was able to record 2 points and 1 rebound. Houston would go on to lose the series to Utah in 6 games.

Woods joined CAI Zaragoza in 2009.

In October 2010 he signed with Al Riyadi Beirut in Lebanon, where he averaged 14.3 points and 14.3 rebounds. In 2012, he signed with Al Riyadi Beirut again. On 20 December 2014 he was released by Al Riyadi Beirut.

NBA career statistics

Regular season 

|-
| align="left" | 2001–02
| align="left" | Minnesota
| 60 || 0 || 8.6 || .344 || .000 || .733 || 2.0 || .4 || .3 || .6 || 1.8
|-
| align="left" | 2002–03
| align="left" | Minnesota
| 38 || 11 || 9.3 || .382 || .333 || .778 || 2.5 || .5 || .3 || .3 || 2.1
|-
| align="left" | 2003–04
| align="left" | Miami
| 38 || 2 || 13.3 || .458 || .000 || .600 || 3.5 || .3 || .3 || .5 || 3.2
|-
| align="left" | 2004–05
| align="left" | Toronto
| 45 || 30 || 15.8 || .433 || .000 || .576 || 4.9 || .4 || .2 || .9 || 3.9
|-
| align="left" | 2005–06
| align="left" | Toronto
| 27 || 4 || 12.0 || .475 || .000 || .429 || 4.1 || .1 || .3 || .9 || 2.3
|-
| align="left" | 2007–08
| align="left" | Houston
| 7 || 0 || 2.4 || .600 || .000 || .000 || .1 || .3 || .0 || .0 || .9
|- class="sortbottom"
| style="text-align:center;" colspan="2"| Career
| 215 || 47 || 11.3 || .419 || .143 || .642 || 3.2 || .3 || .3 || .6 || 2.6

Playoffs 

|-
| align="left" | 2003
| align="left" | Minnesota
| 2 || 0 || 1.0 || .333 || .000 || .000 || .5 || .0 || .0 || .0 || 1.0
|-
| align="left" | 2004
| align="left" | Miami
| 1 || 0 || 2.0 || .000 || .000 || .000 || .0 || .0 || .0 || .0 || .0
|-
| align="left" | 2008
| align="left" | Houston
| 1 || 0 || 1.0 || 1.000 || .000 || .000 || 1.0 || .0 || .0 || .0 || 2.0
|- class="sortbottom"
| style="text-align:center;" colspan="2"| Career
| 4 || 0 || 1.3 || .500 || .000 || .000 || .5 || .0 || .0 || .0 || 1.0

Euroleague

|-
| style="text-align:left;"| 2007–08
| style="text-align:left;"| Efes Pilsen
| 16 || 11 || 21.1 || .590 || .000 || .766 || 6.5 || .9 || .8 || 1.4 || 8.0 || 13.8
|-
| style="text-align:left;"| 2008–09
| style="text-align:left;"| Žalgiris
| 8 || 8 || 31.2 || .569 || .000 || .711 || 9.0 || 1.5 || 1.4 || 2.4 || 12.3 || 20.3

National team career
In July 2013, Woods became a naturalized Lebanese citizen, and a member of their national basketball team.

After the 2013 suspension in which Lebanon were unable to compete FIBA competitions, he was once again called by 2015 head coach Veselin Matić as a solution to the 5 position for the coming 2015 FIBA Asia Championship in September.

Acting career
Woods appeared in the 2022 holiday musical movie Spirited as The Ghost of Christmas Yet To Come.

See also
 List of NCAA Division I men's basketball players with 13 or more blocks in a game

References

External links
NBA.com Page

ESPN.com Page
Euroleague.net Profile
Basketpedya.com Profile

1978 births
Living people
21st-century African-American sportspeople
African-American basketball players
Al Riyadi Club Beirut basketball players
American expatriate basketball people in Canada
American expatriate basketball people in Iran
American expatriate basketball people in Lebanon
American expatriate basketball people in Lithuania
American expatriate basketball people in Spain
American expatriate basketball people in Turkey
American men's basketball players
Anadolu Efes S.K. players
Arizona Wildcats men's basketball players
Austin Toros players
Basketball players from St. Louis
Basket Zaragoza players
BC Žalgiris players
Centers (basketball)
Charlotte Bobcats expansion draft picks
Houston Rockets players
Lebanese men's basketball players
Liga ACB players
Mahram Tehran BC players
McDonald's High School All-Americans
Medalists at the 1997 Summer Universiade
Miami Heat players
Minnesota Timberwolves draft picks
Minnesota Timberwolves players
Parade High School All-Americans (boys' basketball)
Toronto Raptors players
Universiade gold medalists for the United States
Universiade medalists in basketball
Wake Forest Demon Deacons men's basketball players
Zob Ahan Isfahan BC players
20th-century African-American sportspeople